The Straw Lover (French: L'Amant de paille) is a 1951 French comedy film directed by Gilles Grangier and starring Jean-Pierre Aumont, Gaby Sylvia and Alfred Adam. Louis de Funès plays a psychiatrist. The film based on Georges Feydeau's play "Le Dindon" (The Turkey).

The film's sets were designed by the art director Guy de Gastyne.

Cast 
 Jean-Pierre Aumont as Stanislas Michodier (Jimmy's friend)
 Gaby Sylvia as Gisèle Sarrazin de Fontenoy (Gaston's wife)
 Alfred Adam as Gaston Sarrazin de Fontenoy (Gisèle's husband)
 André Versini as Jimmy (Gisèle's lover)
 Louis de Funès as Bruno (the psychiatrist)
 Félix Oudart as Mr Kervadec
 Lucienne Granier as the lady in black
 Odette Barancey as the concierge
 Marcel Melrac as Mr Henri
 Emile Genevois as the photographer
 Gérard Buhr as one of Gaston's employées

References

Bibliography
 Dayna Oscherwitz & MaryEllen Higgins. The A to Z of French Cinema. Scarecrow Press, 2009.

External links 
 
 L’Amant de paille (1951) at the Films de France

1951 films
French comedy films
1950s French-language films
French black-and-white films
Films directed by Gilles Grangier
Films scored by Gérard Calvi
1951 comedy films
Films based on works by Georges Feydeau
1950s French films